Șerbănești may refer to:

Șerbănești, a commune in Olt County, Romania
Șerbănești, a village in Poienarii de Muscel Commune, Argeș County, Romania
Șerbănești, a village in Rociu Commune, Argeș County, Romania
Șerbănești, a village in Liești Commune, Galați County, Romania
Șerbănești, a village in Zvoriștea Commune, Suceava County, Romania
Șerbănești, a village in Lăpușata Commune, Vâlcea County, Romania
Șerbănești, a village in Păușești Commune, Vâlcea County, Romania
Șerbănești, a village in Sălătrucel Commune, Vâlcea County, Romania
Șerbănești, a village in Ștefănești Commune, Vâlcea County, Romania
Șerbănești, a village in Corbița Commune, Vrancea County, Romania

See also 
 Șerban (name)
 Șerbești (disambiguation)
 Șerbăneasa (disambiguation)
 Șerbănescu (surname)